10,000 BC is a 2008 American action-adventure film directed by Roland Emmerich, starring Steven Strait and Camilla Belle. The film is set in the prehistoric era and depicts the journeys of a prehistoric tribe of mammoth hunters. The world premiere was held on February 10, 2008, at Sony Center on Potsdamer Platz in Berlin.

The film was a box office hit, but consistently regarded by professional critics as Emmerich's worst film, as well as one of the worst films of 2008.

Plot
Circa 10,000 BC, a hunter-gatherer tribe called the Yagahl live in the Ural Mountains and survive by hunting woolly mammoths. The tribe is led by a hunter who has killed a mammoth single-handedly and earned the White Spear, and venerate Old Mother, an elderly woman with shamanistic powers. The mammoths begin to dwindle, and the village chief finds a young girl named Evolet who survived a massacre of her village, perpetrated by what Old Mother calls "four-legged demons" who will come when "the Yagahl go on their last hunt". She prophesies that whoever kills the leader of the "demons" will win both Evolet and the White Spear, becoming the next village chief. The tribe believe that the "demons" are mammoths, whose return will save them from starvation. The chief, however, does not believe the prophecy and leaves to find another way to save his people. He entrusts the White Spear, his son D'Leh, and the true purpose of his quest to his friend Tic'Tic. The rest of the tribe, including D'Leh's rival Ka'Ren, believe that D'Leh's father was a coward and fled. Over time, D'Leh and Evolet fall in love.

When the mammoths finally return, D'Leh hunts them with the men of the tribe under Tic'Tic's leadership and manages to kill one by accident, inadvertently winning both the White Spear and marriage to Evolet. The village believes Old Mother's prophecy is coming true, but D'Leh is consumed by guilt for not earning the White Spear fairly. After speaking with Tic'Tic, he gives up the White Spear, forfeiting his marriage to Evolet. The next day, horse-raiders attack the camp, enslaving Evolet and several others, and killing many of the tribe. D'Leh, Tic'Tic, Ka'Ren, and young boy Baku set out to rescue their fellow Yagahl, but Evolet is recaptured with Ka'Ren and Baku during an attack on the slavers by terror birds, and Tic'Tic is wounded. While hunting, D'Leh falls into a pit, where he rescues a Smilodon (saber-toothed tiger) before escaping himself. After Tic'Tic recovers, they make their way to a village of sedentary farmers and learn of a prophecy from the Naku, another tribe; whoever talks to a Smilodon they call the "Spear-Tooth" will help free their people. D'Leh realizes the prophecy is about him when the Smilodon he rescued arrives and refuses to kill him. They also learn that D'Leh's father was a guest of the Naku until the slavers captured him. Tic'Tic finally reveals to D'Leh that his father did not abandon the tribe. Rather he set out to save it, but let the others believe he had fled to prevent them from following him.

Several tribes form a coalition to pursue the raiders with D'Leh as their leader. They find the ships holding Evolet and their families but fail to reach them before the raiders cast off. The war party nearly dies out while journeying through a treacherous desert, but D'leh learns to use the North Star to navigate the dunes. On the other side of the desert, they discover an advanced civilization, ruled by an enigmatic god-king known as the "Almighty". Here it is discovered that the kidnapped Yagahl are used as slave labor to build a pyramid. The warlord who kidnapped Evolet tries unsuccessfully to win her love, only to be arrested by the Almighty's priests when they find he has taken her without permission. During a night scouting raid, D'Leh learns of the Almighty and the fate of his father, who perished as a slave. The party is spotted by the guards, who are killed by Tic'Tic before he succumbs to his wounds. Meanwhile, the Almighty's priests believe that Evolet is destined to kill The Almighty, based on the whip scars on her hands matching the stars they call the "Mark of the Hunter" and an ancient prophecy foreseeing their civilization's downfall. The Almighty deduces that Evolet is merely the herald of the true Hunter, which leaves him and his priests unsettled. D'Leh starts a rebellion among the slaves, killing many of the Almighty's forces, though Ka'Ren is killed.

The Almighty offers Evolet and the other hunters to D'Leh in exchange for abandoning his rebellion. D'Leh feigns acceptance but kills the Almighty with a spear, breaking his illusion of godhood. During the ensuing battle, Evolet is killed by the warlord who is then killed by D'Leh, but is restored to life when Old Mother sacrifices herself. With the Almighty dead and his civilization destroyed, the Yagahl bid farewell to the other tribes and return home with seeds given to them by the Naku to start a new life.

Cast

Development

Casting
Emmerich opened casting sessions in late October 2005. In February 2006, Camilla Belle and Steven Strait were announced to star in the film, with Strait as the mammoth hunter and Belle as his love. Emmerich decided that casting well known actors would distract from the realistic feel of the prehistoric setting. "If like, Jake Gyllenhaal turned up in a movie like this, everybody would be, 'What's that?'", he explained. The casting of unknown actors also helped keep the film's budget down.

Production
At the 2008 Wondercon, Emmerich mentioned the fiction of Robert E. Howard as a primary influence for the film's setting, as well as his love for the film Quest for Fire and the book Fingerprints of the Gods. He invited composer Harald Kloser to help write the screenplay after he liked his story suggestions to The Day After Tomorrow. When the project received the greenlight from Columbia Pictures, screenwriter John Orloff began work on a new draft of the original script. Columbia Pictures, under Sony Pictures Entertainment, dropped the project due to a busy release calendar, and Warner Bros. picked up the project in Sony's absence. The script went through a second revision with Matthew Sand and a final revision with Robert Rodat.

Production began in early 2006 in South Africa and Namibia.  Location filming also took place in southern New Zealand and Thailand. Emmerich wanted to shoot the entire film in Africa but was barred from shooting a certain helicopter scene which led to them going to New Zealand for those shots. Before shooting began, the production had spent eighteen months on research and development for the computer-generated imagery. Two companies recreated prehistoric animals. To cut time (it was taking sixteen hours to render a single frame) 50% of the CGI models' fur was removed, as "it turned out half the fur looked the same" to the director. Filming took place for a total of 102 days, 20 days longer than planned.

Language
Emmerich rejected making the film in an ancient language (similar to The Passion of the Christ or Apocalypto), deciding that it would not be as emotionally engaging.

Dialect coach Brendan Gunn was hired by Emmerich and Kloser to create "a half dozen" languages for the film. Gunn has stated that he collaborated informally with film lead Steven Strait to improvise what the languages would sound like. He also used some local African languages and their dialects, including the Oshiwambo language native to Namibia, which can be heard faintly by the wise blind man.

Alternate ending
In an alternative ending, the scene shifts forward many years into the future, showing Baku's retelling of the story by the camp fire. It ends with a child asking what had happened to the "Mountains of the Gods", and Baku responds, "They were taken back by the sands. Lost to time, lost to man".

Visual and sound effects
The mammoths in the movie were based on elephants and fossils of mammoths, while the saber-toothed cat was based on tigers and ligers (a lion/tiger hybrid).

The sounds made by the saber-toothed cat in the movie are based on the vocalization of tigers and lions.

Reception

Critics noted that the film is archaeologically inaccurate and contains many factual errors and anachronisms. On the review aggregator Rotten Tomatoes, the film holds an approval rating of 9% based on 150 reviews, with an average rating of 3.40/10. The website's critics' consensus states: "With attention strictly paid to style instead of substance, or historical accuracy, 10,000 BC is a visually impressive but narratively flimsy epic." Metacritic assigned the film a weighted average score of 34 out of 100, based on 29 critics, indicating "generally unfavorable reviews". Audiences surveyed by CinemaScore gave the film an average grade of "C" on an A+ to F scale.

Todd McCarthy of Variety wrote: "Conventional where it should be bold and mild where it should be wild, 10,000 BC reps a missed opportunity to present an imaginative vision of a prehistoric moment." Peter Bradshaw of The Guardian wrote: "Roland Emmerich's great big CGI blockbuster lumbers along like one of the woolly mammoths that roam across the screen."

Composer Thomas Wander won a BMI Film Music Award for his work on the film.

Box office
The film was a moderate success at the box office. In its opening weekend, the film grossed $35.8 million in 3,410 theaters in the United States and Canada, ranking No. 1 at the box office, and grossing over $22 million more than the film in second place, College Road Trip. , it has grossed approximately $268.6 million worldwide—$94.6 million in the United States and Canada and $174 million in other territories—including $17.2 million in Mexico, $13.1 million in Spain, $11.3 million in the United Kingdom, and $10.8 million in China. This also makes it the first film of 2008 to surpass the $200 million mark.

Home media
The DVD of the film was released on June 17, 2008, in single-disc editions of DVD and Blu-ray Disc in the United States. Best Buy released a 2-disc limited edition along with the DVD and Blu-ray Disc releases. It was released on July 1, 2008, in the United Kingdom. The film grossed $31,341,721 in DVD sales, bringing its total film gross to $300,414,491.

See also
 List of American films of 2008
 One Million Years B.C. – A similar film released in 1966
 Quest for Fire – A similar film released in 1981

References

External links
 
 
 
 
 
 
 

2008 films
2000s action adventure films
2000s fantasy adventure films
American epic films
American action adventure films
American fantasy adventure films
Centropolis Entertainment films
2000s English-language films
Fictional-language films
Films about hunter-gatherers
Films directed by Roland Emmerich
Films scored by Harald Kloser
Films set in Europe
Films set in prehistory
Films shot in Namibia
Films shot in New Zealand
Films shot in South Africa
Legendary Pictures films
Fiction about neanderthals
Prehistoric people in popular culture
Warner Bros. films
2000s American films